Nuozhadu is a town in Lancang Lahu Autonomous County, Yunnan, China.

Administrative division
As of 2016, the town is divided into ten villages: 
Yaofangba
Yakou
Nanxian
Huangbahe
Mengkuang
Xiangshuihe
Biandanshan
Longshan
Luoshuidong
Qianmai

History
In the Qing dynasty (1644–1911), it came under the jurisdiction of Dayakou Tusi.

In 1940, it belonged to the 3rd District. That same year, the 3rd District was revoked and it belonged to Xinya Township.

In 1949, it came under the jurisdiction of Ningjiang County. In 1953, Ningjiang County was revoked and Yakou District was set up. In 1969 it was renamed "Xianfeng Commune" and then "Yakou Commune" in 1971. In 1988, Yakou Township was incorporated. In 1998, China and the Netherlands have set up "Nuozhadu Provincial Nature Reserve" in the region to protect wild animal. In January 2006, the villages of Longshan, Qianmai and Luoshuidong were merged into Nuozhadu and it was upgraded to a town.

Geography
The town is situated at eastern Lancang Lahu Autonomous County. It borders Nanling Township and Qianliu Yi Ethnic Township in the north,  in the east, Fazhanhe Hani Ethnic Township and Menghai County in the south, and Menglang Town in the west.

There are nine rivers and streams in the town, such as the Black River, Qianmai River, Nanting River, and Xiangshui River.

Economy
The economy of the town has a predominantly agricultural orientation, including farming and pig-breeding. Economic crops are mainly peanut, sugarcane, natural rubber, Lanxangia tsaoko, and sweet potato.

The region abounds with gold, lead, and zinc.

Demographics

As of 2017, the National Bureau of Statistics of China estimates the town's population now to be 30,419.

Tourist attractions
Mengkuang Cliff Carvings of the Yuan dynasty (1271–1368) is a provincial cultural relic preservation organ. And Yakou Government Site is a county level cultural relic preservation organ.

Transportation
The National Highway G214 passes across the town east to west.

References

Bibliography

Towns of Pu'er City
Divisions of Lancang Lahu Autonomous County